Calvin Cornelius Hunt (born December 31, 1947, in Oceanside, California) is a former American football player. He played center one season for the National Football League's Philadelphia Eagles (1970) and two for the Houston Oilers (1972–1973).

Born in Oceanside, California but raised in Edna, Texas, Hunt played at Edna High School for coach Allen Boren. Following graduation in 1966, Hunt attended Baylor University, where he played for John Bridgers the first three years, and for Bill Beall during his senior year.

Hunt was drafted 261st overall (11th round) in the 1970 NFL Draft by the Pittsburgh Steelers, but made his debut for the Philadelphia Eagles. Leaving the team after one season, Hunt later played two years for the Houston Oilers.

External links
NFL.com player page

References

1947 births
Living people
Sportspeople from Oceanside, California
People from Edna, Texas
American football centers
Baylor Bears football players
Philadelphia Eagles players
Houston Oilers players